The 2024 Missouri gubernatorial election will be held on November 5, 2024, to elect the governor of Missouri, concurrently with the 2024 U.S. presidential election, as well as elections to the United States Senate and elections to the United States House of Representatives and various state and local elections. Incumbent Republican Governor Mike Parson is term-limited and cannot seek re-election to a second full term in office.

Republican primary

Candidates

Declared
Mike Kehoe, Lieutenant Governor of Missouri (2018–present)

Formed exploratory committee
Bill Eigel, state senator from the 23rd district (2017–present)

Potential
Jay Ashcroft, Missouri Secretary of State (2017–present) and son of former governor John Ashcroft

Endorsements

Democratic primary

Candidates

Potential 
 Quinton Lucas, Mayor of Kansas City (2019–present)
 Crystal Quade, Minority Leader of the Missouri House of Representatives (2019–present) from the 132nd district (2017–present)

General election

Predictions

Notes

Partisan clients

References

External links
Official campaign websites 
Mike Kehoe (R) for Governor

2024
Governor
Missouri